Byung-ho, also spelled Byong-ho or Pyong-ho, is a Korean masculine given name. The meaning differs based on the hanja used to write each syllable of the name. There are 17 hanja with the reading "byung" and 49 hanja with the reading "ho" on the South Korean government's official list of hanja which may be used in given names. According to South Korean government data, Byung-ho was the third-most popular name for baby boys in 1940.

People with this name include:
Im Pyong-ho (born 1916), formerly one of South Korea's unconverted long-term prisoners
Jon Pyong-ho (born 1926), North Korean politician, Chief Secretary of the Cabinet's Korean Workers Party Committee 
Son Byong-ho (born 1962), South Korean actor
Shin Byung-ho (born 1977), South Korean football player
Park Byung-ho (born 1986), South Korean baseball player
Yoon Byung-hoon (stage name: Ji Yoon-ho) (born 1991), South Korean actor

See also
List of Korean given names

References

Korean masculine given names